Cavemovirus is a genus of viruses, in the family Caulimoviridae order Ortervirales. Plants serve as natural hosts. There are three species in this genus. Diseases associated with this genus include: vein-clearing or banding mosaic.

Taxonomy
The genus contains the following species:
Cassava vein mosaic virus
Epiphyllum virus 4
Sweet potato collusive virus

Structure
Viruses in Cavemovirus are non-enveloped, with icosahedral geometries, and T=7 symmetry. The diameter is around 50 nm. Genomes are circular and non-segmented. The genome codes for 5 proteins.

Life cycle
Viral replication is nuclear/cytoplasmic. Replication follows the dsDNA (RT) replication model. dsDNA (RT) transcription is the method of transcription. The virus exits the host cell by nuclear pore export, and tubule-guided viral movement. Plants serve as the natural host. The virus is transmitted via a vector (aphid insects). Transmission routes are mechanical.

References

External links
 Viralzone: Cavemovirus
 ICTV

Caulimoviridae
Virus genera